The commune of Ngagara is a commune of Bujumbura in northwest Burundi.
The capital is at Ngagara, Bujumbura.

References

Ngagara